Lying in state is the tradition in which the body of a deceased official, such as a head of state, is placed in a state building, either outside or inside a coffin, to allow the public to pay their respects. It traditionally takes place in a major government building of a country, state, or city. While the practice differs among countries, in the United States, a viewing in a location other than a  government building, such as a church, may be referred to as lying in repose. It is a more formal and public kind of wake or viewing. Lying in state often precedes a state funeral.

Canada
In Canada, official lying in state is a part of a state funeral, an honor generally reserved for former governors general and former prime ministers. It is held in the Centre Block of Parliament Hill, in the national capital, Ottawa, Ontario. Ex-governors general lie in state in the Senate Chamber while former prime ministers lie in the Hall of Honour. During the period of lying in state, the caskets are flanked at each corner by a Guard of honour, composed of four members drawn from the Canadian Forces and Royal Canadian Mounted Police, as well as members of the Governor General's Foot Guards for former governors general, and guards from the parliamentary security forces for former prime ministers. Guards stand at each corner with heads bowed and weapons inverted (resting on Arms reversed) with their backs turned towards the casket.

Provinces may also mount state funerals and have a lying in state for a distinguished former resident. For instance, Maurice Richard, nationally known hockey player, was given a state funeral by the province of Quebec when he died in 2000; his coffin lay in state at the Molson Centre. This process was repeated for fellow Canadiens players, Jean Béliveau in December 2014 and Guy Lafleur in May 2022.  

Upon his death in October 2012, 24th Lieutenant Governor of Ontario and former member of parliament Lincoln Alexander received only the second provincial state funeral in the province. Ontario staged its first state funeral in October 1982 for former Premier John Robarts.

Alexander lay in state in the Ontario Legislative Building in Toronto then in repose in Hamilton City Hall, his hometown. The service was held in Hamilton Place. During the procession from city hall, the casket was escorted by mounted police officers, marching police, firefighters and military and a massed pipe band representing several police and fire services. 

On 2 July 2019, Lieutenant Governor of Saskatchewan W. Thomas Molloy died. He was installed as the 22nd Lieutenant Governor on 21 March 2018, and approximately a year later, diagnosed with pancreatic cancer. His state funeral service was held at Merlis Belsher Place on the campus of the University of Saskatchewan. Malloy had earlier served as Chancellor of the university. Members of the public were able to sign books of condolence at the Saskatchewan Legislative Building and Government House in Regina and city hall in Saskatoon.

Premier Scott Moe stated that flags in the province would fly at half-mast until sunset on the day of Malloy's funeral, which was later scheduled for 13 July. During the service, a detail of Royal Canadian Mounted Police guarded the casket and following, members of 15 Wing Moose Jaw from the Royal Canadian Air Force flew over Merlis Belsher Place. 

Jocelyne Roy-Vienneau, Lieutenant Governor of New Brunswick, died 2 August 2019, after holding office since 23 October 2014. She received a state funeral 8 August 2019 and the flag on the Peace Tower of the Parliament Buildings flew at half-mast from 6 August through 8 August. 

Municipalities may offer civic funerals to prominent deceased current or former politicians.

North Korea
In North Korea, the body of the late leader Kim Jong-il was displayed in a glass coffin surrounded with red flowers at the Kumsusan Memorial Palace in Pyongyang prior to his funeral, which began and ended at the palace. An honor guard armed with AK-47s was present. Jong-il's father Kim Il-sung, the founding president, is on display elsewhere in the palace.

Soviet Union

During the time of the Soviet Union (1917–1991), the state funerals of the most senior political and military leaders, such as Vladimir Lenin, Joseph Stalin, Leonid Brezhnev, Yuri Andropov, and Konstantin Chernenko all followed the same basic outline. They took place in Moscow, beginning with a public lying in state of the deceased in the House of the Unions, and ending with an interment at Red Square.

For the lying in state at the House of the Unions, the coffin would be placed on display in the Column Hall, which would be decorated by flowers, numerous red flags and other communist symbols. The mourners, which usually would be brought in by the thousands, shuffled up a marble staircase beneath chandeliers draped in black gauze. On the stage at the left side of the Column Hall, a full orchestra in black tailcoats played classical music. The deceased's embalmed body, dressed in a black suit, white shirt and a tie, was displayed in an open coffin on a catafalque banked with carnations, red roses and tulips, facing the queue of mourners. A small guard of honour would be in attendance in the background. At the right side of the hall, seats were placed for guests of honour, with the front row reserved for the dead leader's family.

On the day of the funeral, a military funeral parade would take place during which the coffin would be conveyed from the House of the Unions to Red Square where burial would take place. Lenin and Stalin were placed inside the Lenin Mausoleum, while Brezhnev, Andropov, and Chernenko were interred in individual graves in the Kremlin Wall Necropolis.

Singapore
At state funerals in Singapore, the state flag is draped over the coffin. The vigil guard may be deployed during the public lying in state of the deceased person at Parliament House. The deployment of the vigil guard is the highest form of respect accorded by the nation to the deceased. 

Similar to British traditions, the vigil guard is composed of groups of five commissioned officers from the Singapore Armed Forces (SAF) and Singapore Police Force (SPF) who stand guard around the clock in shifts of 30 minutes. Four of the five officers stand facing outward at each of the four corners of the coffin, while the fifth and most senior stands in front and faces inward. Their heads are bowed and their ceremonial swords are inverted.

Vigil guards were stationed at the public lying in state of Goh Keng Swee in May 2010, Lee Kuan Yew in March 2015, and S. R. Nathan in August 2016.

South Africa

Nelson Mandela was the first democratically elected president to lie in state in South Africa. The event took place at the Union Buildings in Pretoria, the same site where he was inaugurated as the President of South Africa on 10 May 1994. Mandela lay in state from 11 December through 13 December 2013 with thousands of South Africans filing past the coffin before it was flown to Mthatha where Mandela was buried on 15 December 2013 in nearby Qunu in the Eastern Cape.

From 30 December to 31 December 2021, revered anti-apartheid fighter Archbishop Desmond Tutu lay in state at St. George's Cathedral in Cape Town prior to his funeral being held at the same location on 1 January 2022.

United Kingdom

In state and ceremonial funerals in the United Kingdom, lying in state traditionally takes place in Westminster Hall. The coffin is placed on a catafalque and is guarded, around the clock, by detachments from the following units:
 Sovereign's Bodyguard
 His Majesty's Bodyguard of the Honourable Corps of Gentlemen-at-Arms
 The King's Bodyguard of the Yeomen of the Guard
 The Royal Company of Archers, The King's Bodyguard for Scotland
 Household Division
 Household Cavalry
 The Life Guards
 The Blues and Royals (Royal Horse Guards and 1st Dragoons)
 Foot Guards
 Grenadier Guards
 Coldstream Guards
 Scots Guards
 Irish Guards
 Welsh Guards

There are differences between lying in state at a State Funeral, and that of a Ceremonial Funeral. At a State Funeral, the guard detachment consists of ten members, with six drawn from the Sovereign's Bodyguard and four from the Household Division. The four members of the Household Division, all of whom are officers, and who are drawn either from the two regiments of the Household Cavalry (one pair from each), or one of the Foot Guards regiments, form the 'Inner Guard'; they stand one each corner of the catafalque next to the coffin. The six members of the Sovereign's Bodyguard consist of four from the Yeomen of the Guard, and two from either the Gentlemen-at-Arms or the Royal Company of Archers, and form the 'Outer Guard'. The Yeomen of the Guard take position at the corners of the dais on which the catafalque is mounted, outside the officers from the Household Division, while the final two take position on the dais at the foot of the coffin. Each detachment stands vigil for twenty minutes, facing out from the coffin with heads bowed and weapons inverted. The Yeomen of the Guard maintain a constant presence throughout the period of lying in state, while the other units rotate every six hours. At a Ceremonial Funeral, such as that of Queen Elizabeth The Queen Mother, only the Inner Guard stands vigil, with detachments of four from each of the ten named units at their post for twenty minutes, and units rotating every six hours.

On three occasions, the guard has been mounted by four members of the royal family. At the lying in state of King George V in 1936, the guard was mounted by his four sons King Edward VIII, the Duke of York (future George VI), the Duke of Gloucester and the Duke of Kent. For Queen Elizabeth The Queen Mother's lying-in-state in 2002, the guard was mounted by her four grandsons, the Prince of Wales (future Charles III), the Duke of York, the Earl of Wessex, and Viscount Linley. All Queen Elizabeth II's children took guard at 19:40 BST on 12 September 2022 at the lying-in-repose at St Giles' Cathedral, Edinburgh. During this vigil, Anne, Princess Royal became the first woman ever to stand guard. As part of the late Queen's lying in state in London, at 19:30 BST on 16 September 2022, her four children stood vigil for the second time. The Queen's eight grandchildren held a vigil the following day on 17 September 2022.

The tradition of lying in state in the United Kingdom dates back to the seventeenth century, when Stuart sovereigns lay in state. The first British monarch to lie in state in Westminster Hall was King Edward VII in 1910, apparently inspired by William Gladstone who had lain in state in the hall in 1898. Queen Victoria requested that she should not lie in state but was given a semi-private lying in state at Osborne House on the Isle of Wight, where she died in 1901, for family and servants to pay their respects.

United States

Lying in state in the United States is the rare honor either authorized by a congressional resolution or approved by the congressional leadership, when permission is granted by survivors, to a deceased member of government (or former member) whereby his or her remains are placed in the rotunda of the United States Capitol in Washington, D.C. for public viewing. The casket is guarded by members of the six branches of the United States armed forces. By regulation and custom, only presidents, military commanders, justices of the Supreme Court, and members of Congress are granted the honor of lying in state. 

It differs from lying in honor in that individuals lying in state have guards of honor representing each branch of the U.S. Armed Forces, while individuals lying in honor have the U.S. Capitol Police as civilian guards of honor. Six Americans have lain in honor, beginning in 1998. In 2005, Rosa Parks became the first woman to lie in honor in the United States Capitol.

Except for Presidents and former Presidents, the honor is not automatic. Not all those entitled to the honor have it accepted by their survivors. The first leader to receive this honor was Henry Clay, former Speaker of the House of Representatives, when he died in 1852. Since then, the honor has been extended to 36 people, including 12 presidents and four unknown soldiers, representing U.S. service members who have died without their remains being identified. Harry Truman, Richard Nixon and their families declined services at the Capitol.  To date, only those who have lain in state have done so upon the catafalque constructed for the funeral of Abraham Lincoln. Those who have lain in honor have been borne on other biers.

States and cities
Some U.S. states and cities extend similar honors.

Arizona
Upon his death in August 2018, U.S. Senator John McCain lay in state at the State Capitol of his home state of Arizona before receiving the same honor in the U.S. Capitol two days later.

California
After a memorial service outside the Polk Street entrance of San Francisco City Hall on 29 November 1978, Mayor George Moscone and city Supervisor Harvey Milk lay in state in the Rotunda until 30 November, after their assassination by former Supervisor Dan White. The chamber was also filled with more than 400 floral tributes to the two men.

In San Francisco, Mayor Ed Lee lay in state in the Rotunda of San Francisco City Hall after his death in office on 12 December 2017.

Georgia
After his death in July 2020, U.S. Representative John Lewis received similar honors from his home state of Georgia and also was the first African American member of Congress to lie in state in the Capitol Rotunda. Because of his role in the Selma to Montgomery marches during the civil rights movement, Lewis also lay in state for one day in the Alabama Capitol in Montgomery.

Kentucky
Through 2022, 23 people have lain in state at the Kentucky Capitol building rotunda in Frankfort. This includes not only politicians, but also civilians. Kentucky-based Kentucky Fried Chicken (KFC) founder Colonel Harlan Sanders would also be among those who received the honor of lying in state in the Kentucky Capitol's rotunda following his death in 1980. After his death in November 2022, former Kentucky Governor and renowned restaurant business mogul John Y. Brown Jr. would also be among those who had the honor of lying in state at the Kentucky Capitol as well.

Hawaii 
Eight people have lain in state at the Hawaii State Capitol, among which include former Governor John A. Burns in 1975, U.S. Senator Spark Matsunaga in 1990, famous Hawaiian singer Israel Kamakawiwoʻole upon his death in 1997, U.S. Representative Patsy Mink in 2002, former U.S. Senator Hiram Fong in 2004, Daniel Inouye, President pro tempore of the U.S. Senate, in 2012, and former U.S. Senator Daniel Akaka in 2018.

Michigan
During funeral rites of civil rights icon Rosa Parks in Detroit in November 2005, she lay in repose at the Charles H. Wright Museum of African American History before services and burial.  This followed similar arrangements in December 1997 for Mayor Coleman Young, the first African-American to hold that office.  

Upon the deaths of singer-songwriter Aretha Franklin in August 2018 and former Congresswoman Barbara-Rose Collins in November 2021, both women were also honored at the Wright Museum.

Washington
Upon her death in 1948, Belle Reeves, former state legislator and Washington's first female Secretary of State, received the only state funeral ever held in the House Chamber of the Washington State Legislature.

Vatican City

A deceased pope customarily lies in state in the chapel of the Apostolic Palace (except for Pope Emeritus Benedict XVI) where members of the Papal household and Vatican officials may pay respects. Then, after a Mass of Visitation, the body is moved to St. Peter's Basilica, where it remains until the celebration of a Requiem Mass. The funerals of John Paul II and Benedict XVI followed this custom.

Vietnam
The preserved body of Ho Chi Minh lies in state in the purpose built Ho Chi Minh Mausoleum at the Ho Chi Minh Museum in Hanoi and is open for public viewing.

Coptic Patriarchate
The Coptic Orthodox Church of Alexandria has a tradition of mummifying the deceased pope and placing his body on his throne to enable church followers to have a farewell look at him for a short period of time.  This tradition is one of the ways that ancient Egyptian rituals have survived in the Egyptian church.

Other notable funerals 
 Death and funeral of Pope Benedict XVI
 Death and state funeral of Elizabeth II
 Death and funeral of Corazon Aquino
 Death and state funeral of Omar Bongo
 Death and state funeral of George H. W. Bush
 Death and state funeral of Gerald Ford
 Death and state funeral of Kim Il-sung
 Death and state funeral of Kim Jong-il
 Death and state funeral of Lech and Maria Kaczyński
 State funeral of John F. Kennedy
 Death and state funeral of Richard Nixon
 Death and state funeral of Ronald Reagan
 Death and state funeral of Norodom Sihanouk
 Death and state funeral of Josip Broz Tito 
 Death and state funeral of Pierre Trudeau
 Death and state funeral of Mao Zedong

See also
 wake or viewing
 Catafalque
 Funeral train
 Lying in repose
 State funeral
 State funerals in the United States and United Kingdom
 Vigil of the Princes

References

Death customs
State ritual and ceremonies